Hypopta amundasa is a moth in the family Cossidae first described by Herbert Druce in 1890. It is found in Ecuador.

The forewings are reddish pink with a dark brown base and outer margin. The wing is thickly streaked with minute black lines. The hindwings are dark brown, with a red spot close to the anal angle.

References

Hypopta
Moths described in 1890